The 2014–15 NC State Wolfpack women's basketball team represents North Carolina State University during the 2014–15 NCAA Division I women's basketball season. The Wolfpack, led by second-year head coach Wes Moore, play their home games at Reynolds Coliseum and were members of the Atlantic Coast Conference. They finished the season 18–15, 7–9 in ACC play to finish in a three way tie for ninth place. They lost in the first round of the ACC women's tournament to Virginia Tech. They were invited to the Women's National Invitation Tournament which they defeated East Tennessee State in the first round, East Carolina in the second round before falling to Temple in the third round.

Roster

Media
WKNC acts as the home for Wolfpack women's basketball. Patrick Kinas and Rachel Stockdale provide the call for the games. ESPN and the ACC RSN will televise select Wolfpack games during the season. All non-televised home conference games will be shown on ESPN3 using the radio broadcasters for the call.

Schedule

|-
!colspan=9 style="background:#CC0000; color:#FFFFFF;"| Exhibition

|-
!colspan=9 style="background:#CC0000; color:#FFFFFF;"| Non-conference regular season

|-
!colspan=9 style="background:#CC0000; color:#FFFFFF;"| ACC regular season

|-
!colspan=9 style="background:#CC0000; color:#FFFFFF;"| ACC Women's Tournament

|-
!colspan=9 style="background:#CC0000; color:#FFFFFF;"| WNIT

Source

Rankings
2014–15 NCAA Division I women's basketball rankings

See also
NC State Wolfpack women's basketball
2014–15 NC State Wolfpack men's basketball team

References

NC State Wolfpack women's basketball seasons
NC State
NC State Wolf
NC State Wolf